R Canum Venaticorum is a Mira variable star in the constellation Canes Venatici. It ranges between magnitudes 6.5 and 12.9 over a period of approximately 329 days.

References

Mira variables
Canes Venatici
Canum Venaticorum, R
120499
M-type giants
067410
Durchmusterung objects
Emission-line stars